The Xtra Factor may refer to:

The Xtra Factor (UK TV series), British television programme
The Xtra Factor (New Zealand TV series), New Zealand television programme
The Xtra Factor (Australian TV series), Australian television programme